Thomas Skovbjerg (born 25 October 1974, in Denmark) is a Danish retired footballer who is last known to have worked as a teacher in his home country.

Career
Skovbjerg started his senior career with Esbjerg fB. In 1999, he signed for Kidderminster Harriers in the English Football League Third Division, where he made forty-three appearances and scored five goals before retiring in 2001.

References

External links
Skovbjerg lift
Thomas the Dane is back 
Setback for Thomas
Injured Dane's lay-off shcok 
Skovbjerg operation
DBU Profile

Association football forwards
Ikast FS players
Danish expatriate men's footballers
Expatriate footballers in England
Danish men's footballers
Association football wingers
Kidderminster Harriers F.C. players
Esbjerg fB players
1974 births
Living people